Diplomacy is a 1916 silent film drama produced by the Famous Players Film Company and distributed by Paramount Pictures. It is based on the 1878 stage play Diplomacy, adapted from the French play Dora (1877) by Victorien Sardou, which had enjoyed revivals and road shows for decades. This film stars Doro reprising her 1914 Broadway revival role. The film is now lost with just a fragment, 1 reel, remaining at the Library of Congress.

The story was filmed again in 1926 as Diplomacy by Paramount with Blanche Sweet starring and her then husband Marshall Neilan directing.

Cast
Marie Doro - Dora
Elliott Dexter - Julian Beauclerc
Edith Campbell - Comtesse Zicka(*as Edith Campbell Walker)
George Majeroni - Count Orloff
Frank Losee - Henri Beauclerc
Russell Bassett - Baron Stein
Ruth Rose - Mion

References

External links

Still photo from Diplomacy
 Diplomacy website dedicated to Sidney Olcott

1916 films
American silent feature films
Films directed by Sidney Olcott
American films based on plays
Films based on works by Victorien Sardou
1916 drama films
Silent American drama films
American black-and-white films
Lost American films
1916 lost films
Lost drama films
1910s American films